Ruppichteroth is a municipality in the Rhein-Sieg district, in the southern part of North Rhine-Westphalia, Germany.  It is located approximately 30 kilometers east of Bonn.

Districts
In 1969, the old municipality of Winterscheid became part of Ruppichteroth. Since then the municipality consists of three districts:
 Ruppichteroth
 Schönenberg
 Winterscheid

History
Ruppichteroth was first mentioned in 843.

Twin towns
  Longdendale, United Kingdom
  Caputh, Germany
  Schenkendöbern, Germany

References

External links
 Official site 

Rhein-Sieg-Kreis